The Metropolitan Police is the police force serving Greater London, England (excluding the City of London).

Metropolitan Police may also refer to:

Bangladesh
 Metropolitan Police (Bangladesh), including:
 Barisal Metropolitan Police
 Chattogram Metropolitan Police
 Chittagong Metropolitan Police
 Dhaka Metropolitan Police
 Gazipur Metropolitan Police
 Khulna Metropolitan Police
 Rajshahi Metropolitan Police
 Rangpur Metropolitan Police
 Sylhet Metropolitan Police

India
Chennai Metropolitan Police
Cyberabad Metropolitan Police
Delhi Police
Kolkata Police
Mumbai Police

United States
 Indianapolis Metropolitan Police Department
 LAPD Metropolitan Division, Los Angeles
 Las Vegas Metropolitan Police Department
 Louisville Metro Police Department
 Metropolitan District Commission Police, the police of the Metropolitan District Commission of Connecticut
 Metropolitan District Commission Police, commonly known as the Metropolitan Police, a former agency in Massachusetts that was merged with the Massachusetts State Police in 1992
 Metropolitan Nashville Police Department
 Metropolitan Police Department, City of St. Louis
 Metropolitan Police Department of the District of Columbia, Washington, D.C.
 Metropolitan Police Force, predecessor of the New York City Police Department
 Metropolitan Transportation Authority Police Department, New York City
 Savannah-Chatham Metropolitan Police Department

Other countries
 Buenos Aires Metropolitan Police (Policía Metropolitana de Buenos Aires), Argentina
  (Policía Metropolitana de Caracas), Venezuela, involved in the 2002 Llaguno Overpass events
 Dublin Metropolitan Police, Ireland, now absorbed into the Garda Síochána
 Greater Jakarta Metropolitan Regional Police, Indonesia
 Metropolitan Toronto Police, Canada, now officially called the Toronto Police Service
 Seoul Metropolitan Police Agency, South Korea
 Tokyo Metropolitan Police Department, Japan
 West Yorkshire Metropolitan Police, England, now West Yorkshire Police

Other uses
 Metropolitan Police F.C., the football club of the Greater London Metropolitan Police